Shannon Savick (born April 12, 1940) is a Minnesota politician and former member of the Minnesota House of Representatives. A member of the Minnesota Democratic–Farmer–Labor Party (DFL), she represented District 27A in southern Minnesota.

Early life, education, and career
Savick grew up in Bricelyn, Minnesota. She attended Minnesota State University, Mankato, graduating with a B.S. in math and physics. She later attended Clark University, graduating with a M.B.A.

She served on the Wells city council and later as mayor.

Minnesota House of Representatives

Elections
Savick announced her intention to run for the Minnesota House of Representatives in August 2011 and challenge incumbent Rep. Tony Cornish, but redistricting following the 2012 Census put her in the district represented by Republican Rich Murray. During the campaign Savick prioritized the reinstatement of the market-value homestead tax credit, a greater emphasis in technical skills in public education and protection of the fire safety account. Savick won, defeating incumbent Rich Murray by 653 votes.  
In 2014, Savick was defeated for re-election by Republican Peggy Bennett by 2,016 votes.

Tenure
Savick was sworn in on January 8, 2013. In her first legislative session she focused heavily on volunteer firefighters, securing passage of a bill that reduced the burden from audits on volunteer fire departments and authored a failed bill that would have provided a $500 tax credit for first responders. Savick was also recognized by the League of Greater Minnesota Cities for her work on economic development policy and was awarded their legislative distinction award.

Committee assignments
For the 2013-14 legislative session, Savick was assigned to the Public Safety Finance and Policy, the Jobs and Economic Development Finance, and the Labor, Workplace and Regulated Industries Committees.

Personal life
Savick is married to her husband, Delmar Phipps. They  reside in Wells, Minnesota.  She was an advocate for children in foster care, and adopted son Francis (Fran) Martin in 1985 after being his foster parent for three years.

References

External links

Rep. Shannon Savick official Minnesota House of Representatives website
Rep. Shannon Savick official campaign website
Project Vote Smart:Shannon Savick Project Vote Smart Profile

1940 births
Living people
Democratic Party members of the Minnesota House of Representatives
Minnesota State University, Mankato alumni
Clark University alumni
Women state legislators in Minnesota
Minnesota city council members
Mayors of places in Minnesota
People from Faribault County, Minnesota
Women mayors of places in Minnesota
21st-century American politicians
21st-century American women politicians
People from Wells, Minnesota
Women city councillors in Minnesota